IEG may refer to:
Zielona Góra Airport in IATA codes
Immediate early gene
Initial Entertainment Group
Internet Entertainment Group
Independent Evaluation Group of World Bank Group
Leibniz Institute of European History